Paul du Quenoy (born November 15, 1977) is an American critic, historian, publisher, and philanthropist.

Background 

Paul du Quenoy graduated from George Washington University and received his Ph.D. from Georgetown University, where he was the last Ph.D. graduate of the Russian History scholar Richard Stites. He has taught at multiple universities and was a Fulbright scholar in Russia. He has received fellowships and other awards from the National Endowment for the Arts, the Kennan Institute for Advanced Russian Studies, the American Historical Association, the Andrew W. Mellon Foundation, and the Slavic-Eurasian Research Center at Hokkaido University in Japan.

Paul du Quenoy is currently President and Publisher of Academica Press, a leading non-fiction publisher based in Washington, DC, and London.

Academic work 

Paul du Quenoy's first book, Stage Fright: Politics and the Performing Arts in Late Imperial Russia, was published in 2009. The book attacks Soviet arguments and demonstrates the vital commercial elements in Russian culture, which du Quenoy argues was relatively free before the Revolution of 1917. According to the Modern Language Review Stage Fright offers "a detailed counter-argument to teleological readings of the cultural and political situation in late imperial Russia." The book was commended by Princeton University Russia scholar Caryl Emerson for "its devastating command of the historical record." Professor E. Anthony Swift of the University of Essex described it as an "important new contribution to the field" that "should be read by anyone interested in the relationship of politics and the arts."

Du Quenoy subsequently published Wagner and the French Muse: Music, Society, and Nation in Modern France (2011), an extensively documented narrative of the German composer Richard Wagner's reception in France. Novelist, poet, and Welsh National Opera dramaturg Simon Rees's review in Opera magazine called it a "rattling good read" and "well-written analysis." His third book, Alexander Serov and the Birth of the Russian Modern (2016, rev. 2nd edition 2022) was described by Russian Review as a "new angle" with "views that allow for a reexamination of some of the century's biggest controversies." Music and Letters described it as "ably written, balanced, highly detailed, and documented with care ... As such it outdoes existing Russian efforts." He has also published a volume of selected music criticism.

Writing 

Paul du Quenoy has contributed criticism and commentary on art, society, and politics to a variety of publications. His writing has appeared in the New York Times, Newsweek, the New York Post, the Washington Times, the Los Angeles Review of Books, the Washington Examiner, the Spectator, the New Criterion, Musical America, Tablet, City Journal, the American Conservative, The Critic (modern magazine), The European Conservative, New York Classical Review, Al Jazeera, and various academic journals, including the American Historical Review, the Journal of Modern History, International History Review, and Russian Review. His music criticism has included bylines from New York, London, Paris, Berlin, Vienna, Budapest, San Francisco, Milan, Tokyo, St. Petersburg, Barcelona, Santa Fe, and the Salzburg, Bayreuth, Verona, and Glimmerglass Festivals.

Society 

Since 2013, Paul du Quenoy has served as chairman of the Russian Ball, Washington, D.C., a major social event in the U.S. capital.

Select bibliography 

Books

Stage Fright: Politics and the Performing Arts in Late Imperial Russia (2009)
Wagner and the French Muse: Music, Society, and Nation in Modern France (2011)
Alexander Serov and the Birth of the Russian Modern (2016/2022)
Cancel Culture: Tales from the Front Lines (2021)
Through the Years with Prince Charming: The Collected Music Criticism of Paul du Quenoy (2021)

Articles

"In the Most Uncompromising Russian Style: The Russian Repertoire at the Metropolitan Opera, 1910–1947," Revolutionary Russia, 28: 1, 2015.
“Arabs under Tsarist Rule: The Russian Occupation of Beirut, 1773–1774,” Russian History/Histoire Russe, 41: 2, 2014.
"Staging Russia: The Russian Repertoire at the Metropolitan Opera, 1943–1972," Beirut Humanities Review, 1: 1, 2014.
“‘It Could Be A Lot Worse:’ Imperial Russian Theatrical Censorship in a Comparative Perspective," Canadian-American Slavic Studies, 46: 3, 2012.
“Tidings From A Faraway East: The Russian Empire and Morocco,” International History Review, 33: 2, June 2011.
“‘Honeymoon to Bayreuth:’ French Appreciations of Richard Wagner in the Interwar Era,” Wagner Journal, 5: 1, March 2011.
“Vladimir Solov’ev in Egypt: The Origins of the ‘Divine Sophia’ in the Development of Russian Religious Philosophy,” Revolutionary Russia, 23: 2, December 2010.
“The Russian Empire and Egypt, 1900–1915,” Journal of World History, 19: 2, June 2008.
“Perfecting the Show Trial: The Case of Baron von Ungern-Sternberg,” Revolutionary Russia, 19:1, June 2006.
“With Allies Like These, Who Needs Enemies?: Russia and the Problem of Italian Entry into World War I,” Canadian Slavonic Papers, 45: 3–4, September–December 2003.
“Warlordism à la russe: Baron von Ungern-Sternberg’s Anti-Bolshevik Crusade, 1917–1921,” Revolutionary Russia, 16: 2, December 2003.
“The Role of Foreign Affairs in the Fall of Nikita Khrushchev in 1964,” International History Review, 25: 2, June 2003.
“The Opiate of the Intellectuals?: Reflections on Communism at the Turn of the Millennium,” Security Studies, 11: 3, Spring 2002.
“Guillaume de Beauplan’s Description de l’Ukraine and its Place in Ukrainian Historiography,” Ukrainian Quarterly, 57: 3–4, Fall-Winter 2001.
“The Skoropadsky Hetmanate and the Ukrainian National Idea,” Ukrainian Quarterly, 56: 3, Fall 2000.

References 

1977 births
Living people
Academic staff of the American University of Beirut
George Washington University alumni
Georgetown University Graduate School of Arts and Sciences alumni
Historians of Russia
21st-century American historians
American male non-fiction writers
21st-century American male writers